The Abertillery by-election of 1 April 1965 was held after the death of Labour MP Llywelyn Williams.

The seat was very safe, having been won at the 1964 United Kingdom general election by over 20,000 votes

Result of the previous general election

Result of the by-election

References

1965 in Wales
1960s elections in Wales
Elections in Monmouthshire
1965 elections in the United Kingdom
By-elections to the Parliament of the United Kingdom in Welsh constituencies
20th century in Monmouthshire
April 1965 events in the United Kingdom
Abertillery